The Meiji Hokkaido-Tokachi Oval, also known as the Obihiro Forest Speed Skating Oval, is an indoor track for speed skating in the city of Obihiro on the island of Hokkaido in Japan. The hall was opened in September 2009 as the second indoor track in Japan, after M-Wave in Nagano.

The course measures  and is built on the same site as the old artificial track from 1986, the Obihiro No Mori Skating Centre.

The venue hosted the speed skating competitions at the 2017 Asian Winter Games.

References

Indoor arenas in Japan
Speed skating venues in Japan
Indoor speed skating venues
Sports venues in Hokkaido
Sports venues completed in 2009
2009 establishments in Japan
2017 Asian Winter Games Venues
Obihiro, Hokkaido